Isru is a village situated near Khanna, Ludhiana, in Punjab, a state near the northern tip of India.
It is a small municipality in Khanna Malerkotla Road, about 12 miles south from the town of Khanna.

Isru Population
According to the, a total of 679 families reside in the Isru village. The Isru has population of 3462 people, of which 1837 are males, while 1625 are females.

In Isru village population of children with age 0-6 is 343 which makes up 9.91% of total population of village. The average sex ratio of Isru village is 885 which is lower than Punjab state average of 895. Child Sex Ratio for the Isru as per census is 649, lower than Punjab average of 846.

References

Villages in Ludhiana district